Andy Gibb's Greatest Hits was the first compilation album by Andy Gibb. It was released in 1980. Aside from the previous singles it also contains three new songs being "Time Is Time", "Me (Without You)" and "Will You Love Me Tomorrow", the latter sung together with P. P. Arnold.

Album content
The three new songs: "Time Is Time", "Me (Without You)" and "Will You Love Me Tomorrow" were recorded in the middle of 1980 at Criteria Studios. Another song, a cover of Bee Gees' "Morning of My Life" was recorded but was not included. On the album's side one, it features his five US Top 10 singles, while side two features three new songs and two songs from After Dark. 

Record World said that "With a teardrop in his voice and cathedral keyboards rising throughout, Gibb sings of heartache." in the single "Me (Without You)."

The CD versions of the songs later appeared on Andy Gibb (Hits Collection) except "Will You Love Me Tomorrow" which appeared on The Millennium Collection.

Track listing

Personnel

Andy Gibb — lead vocals
Barry Gibb — harmony and background vocals, acoustic guitar
Joey Murcia — electric guitar
Tim Renwick — electric guitar
Paul Harris — piano, keyboards (tracks 1-2, 5)
Albhy Galuten — synthesizer, orchestral arrangement
Harold Cowart — bass
Ron Ziegler — drums
John Sambataro — background vocals (tracks 1-5)
George Terry — electric guitar (tracks 1-2)
Joe Walsh — electric guitar (tracks 1-2)
Hugh McCracken — electric guitar (tracks 9-10)
Don Buzzard — electric guitar (tracks 1-2)
Nelson Pedron — percussion (tracks 1-2)
Peter Graves — horn
Whit Sidener — horn
Kenny Faulk — horn
Bill Purse — horn
Neil Bonsanti — horn
Dan Bonsanti — horn
George Bitzer — keyboards
Pat Arnold — lead vocals (track 8)
Michael Brecker — saxophone (track 9)
Randy Brecker — trumpet (track 9)
Tom Roadie — percussion (tracks 9-10)
Bernard Loop — drums (tracks 9-10)
Charlie Chalmers — background vocals (tracks 9-10)
Sandy Rhodes — background vocals (tracks 9-10)
Donna Rhodes — background vocals (tracks 9-10)
Cornell Dupree — electric guitar (tracks 6-8)
Daniel Ben Zebulon — percussion (tracks 6-8)
Steve Gadd — drums (tracks 6-8)
Gene Orloff — concertmaster 
Production
Karl Richardson — sound engineer
Steve Gersky — sound engineer (tracks 1-2)

References

1980 greatest hits albums
Andy Gibb albums
Albums produced by Barry Gibb
RSO Records compilation albums